Otter Brook is a  river located in southwestern New Hampshire in the United States. It is a tributary of The Branch of the Ashuelot River, itself a tributary of the Connecticut River, which flows to Long Island Sound.

Otter Brook begins at Chandler Meadow, in the town of Stoddard, New Hampshire. It flows southwest through the towns of Nelson, Sullivan, and Roxbury, eventually entering the city of Keene, where it joins Minnewawa Brook to form The Branch.

The brook passes through Ellis Reservoir (a small lake in Sullivan) and Otter Brook Lake, a flood control reservoir built on the boundary between Keene and Roxbury. The dam which created Otter Brook lake was completed in 1958. From the village of East Sullivan to Otter Brook Lake, the brook is followed by New Hampshire Route 9.

See also

List of rivers of New Hampshire

References

Rivers of New Hampshire
Rivers of Cheshire County, New Hampshire
Tributaries of the Connecticut River
Stoddard, New Hampshire
Nelson, New Hampshire
Roxbury, New Hampshire
Keene, New Hampshire